Tamar Nadirashvili (born 8 January 1990) is a Georgian football goalkeeper, currently playing for Krka Novo Mesto in Slovenian Championship. She is a member of the Georgian national team.

References

1990 births
Living people
Women's association football goalkeepers
Women's footballers from Georgia (country)
Expatriate women's footballers from Georgia (country)
Georgia (country) women's international footballers
Expatriate sportspeople from Georgia (country) in Slovenia
Expatriate women's footballers in Slovenia
ŽNK Krka players